The Taylorcraft F-21 is a high-wing American-built certified light aircraft developed from earlier Taylorcraft designs.

Development
The Taylorcraft F-21 is a single-engine, high-wing, conventional-gear aircraft. It was developed from the earlier F-19 model with a larger 118 hp engine and an updated FAA-type certificate.

Production
43 examples of the F-21 basic design were built between 1980 and 1990. These were designated the F-21, F-21A and F-21B, with minor changes in design.

Operational history
 A 1988 Taylorcraft F-21 was displayed as an award in the Stardust Casino, Las Vegas. Per the U.S. Civil Aircraft Register, 34 F-21 models were active with private pilot owners in 2014, of which 18 were F-21, 3 were F-21A and 13 were F-21B models.

Variants

F-21
Conventional gear with 118 h.p. Lycoming O-235-C engine. 1,500 lb TOGW. 22 built 1980-1985.
F-21A
F-21 with fuselage fuel tank deleted and 40 gal fuel capacity in two wing tanks. 6 built 1982-1984.
F-21B
F-21 with 42 gal total fuel capacity and 1,750 TOGW. New wing spars and aluminium under-fuselage skinning. 15 built 1985-1990.

A further development was the F-22:
F-22A
Tricycle gear
F-22C STOL 180
Tricycle gear 180hp - 1 built

Specifications (F-21B)

See also

References

Bibliography
Simpson, R.W., The General Aviation Handbook, 2005, Midland Publishing, Hinckley, 
 

F-21
Single-engined tractor aircraft
High-wing aircraft